Following are the results of the Úrvalsdeild, the top tier of the Icelandic football pyramid, in the 1974 season.

Overview
It was contested by 8 teams, and ÍA won the championship. ÍA's Teitur Þórðarson was the top scorer with 9 goals.

League standings

Results
Each team played every opponent once home and away for a total of 14 matches.

References

Úrvalsdeild karla (football) seasons
Iceland
Iceland
1974 in Icelandic football